is a Japanese footballer who plays for Shimizu S-Pulse.

Club statistics
Updated to 24 July 2022.

References

External links

Profile at Kataller Toyama

1994 births
Living people
Association football people from Saitama Prefecture
Japanese footballers
J1 League players
J2 League players
J3 League players
Matsumoto Yamaga FC players
Kataller Toyama players
J.League U-22 Selection players
Tokushima Vortis players
Giravanz Kitakyushu players
Shimizu S-Pulse players
Yokohama FC players
Association football goalkeepers